"Dónde Vas" (English: "Where you go") is a song by Dutch recording artist Loona. It has been released in 1999 through Urban as the third and final single of the debut studio album Lunita. It is also the first original Loona song single release.

Background
After the previous two single releases, the Paradisio's classic "Bailando" and the Mecano cover version Hijo de la Luna, which became massive successes, Loona decided to release a slower uptempo song "Dónde Vas", their first original Loona song release.

Composition
The song is a mixture of a ballad and an uptempo song with a summervibe feeling. Between Refrain and Verses, Flamenco guitars can be heard. Loona sings about positive adjustments, the good things in life and if life gets worse, you have to keep your head up high and try and fight. For the slightly edited Sol Radio Edit, the last refrain has been re-recorded with the children's choir "Los Niños Del Sol".

Commercial performance
The song became a moderate success peaking at #26 and #40 at the German and Swiss Single Chart respectively.

Music video
The video has been shot in 1999 in Sweden. To transfer the good moods of the song, the video has been shot in a Spanish flavoured village, where Loona is walking along to meet young and old citizen who lives there. Near the end Loona is singing with a group of children. The video has been produced by Mekano Baby.

Formats and track listings
 CD-Maxi
 "Dónde Vas" (Sol Radio Edit) - 3:53
 "Dónde Vas" (Live-At-La-Lambra) - 4:03
 "Dónde Vas" (Sol Extended) - 5:30
 "Dónde Vas" (Brilla Del Sol) - 3:58

 Vinyl
 "Dónde Vas" (Sol Extended) - 5:30	
 "Dónde Vas" (Live-At-La-Lambra) - 4:03
 "Dónde Vas" (Sol Edit) - 3:53

 CD-Promo
 "Dónde Vas" (Sol Radio Edit) - 3:53
 "Dónde Vas" (Sol Extended) - 5:30
 "Dónde Vas" (Live-At-La-Lambra) - 4:03
 "Dónde Vas" (Brilla Del Sol) - 3:56

Credits
Artwork – Marc Schilkowski
Choir (vocals) – Los Ninos Del Sol
Co-producer – Henning Reith, Henning Reith
Guitar (Spanish guitars (guitara flamenca)), drums (flamenco drums (la caja)) – Los Hijos Del Sol
Mixed by, arranged by – DJ Sammy, Henning Reith
Music, lyrics – DJ Sammy, Henning Reith, Marie-José van der Kolk
Producer – DJ Sammy
Vocals – Marie-José van der Kolk

Notes
Mixed and arranged at Casa de La Loona/ The Moon.
Special thanx to Los Ninos Del Sol (Eduardo & Sara Jaramago, Juana & Jennifer Gonzalez, Marcos Huertas Jr., Laura Huertas, Rocio Sanchez, Mario-Rosa Bayan) & Los Hijos Del Sol (Marco Huertas Sr., David Huertas, Perdo Sanchez, Carlos Sanchez)

References

1999 songs
Loona (singer) songs